Hiroshi Nosaka (1 October 1914 – 19 August 2004) was a Japanese gymnast. He competed in eight events at the 1936 Summer Olympics.

References

1914 births
2004 deaths
Japanese male artistic gymnasts
Olympic gymnasts of Japan
Gymnasts at the 1936 Summer Olympics
Place of birth missing